Patrick Maule, 1st Earl of Panmure (1585-1661) was a Scottish courtier and aristocrat.

He was a son of Patrick Maule (died 1605) and Margaret Erskine (died 1599), a daughter of John Erskine of Dun and Elizabeth Lindsay.

Patrick Maule was a page in the household of James VI and I. At the Union of Crowns in 1603 he accompanied the court to London. He was subsequently appointed a Gentleman of the Bedchamber.

1n 1610 Maule was granted the Barony of Panmure, and lands in Northamptonshire, including Collyweston in 1625. He was made Sheriff Principal of Forfarshire in 1632.

Maule was a Royalist and fought for Charles I at York in 1642. He was a Colonel in the Scottish Army at Oxford in 1646. He was created Earl of Panmure and Lord Maule of Brechin and Navar.

Patrick Maule died in 1661 was buried at Panbride in Angus.

Marriages and family

His first wife, Frances Stanhope, died in 1624. Their children included:
 George Maule, 2nd Earl of Panmure
 Elizabeth Maule (1622-1650), who married John Lyon, 2nd Earl of Kinghorne
 Anna Maule (1618-1623)
 Jean Maule, who married David Carnegie, 2nd Earl of Northesk
 Henry Maule, who married Jean Wemyss, daughter of John Wemyss, 1st Earl of Wemyss

His second wife, Mary Waldrum or Waldrone (died 1636), was a maid of honour to Henrietta Maria. 
His third wife, Mary Erskine, was a daughter of John Erskine, 2nd Earl of Mar and Marie Erskine, and widow of William Keith, 6th Earl Marischal. They married at Keith Marischal in East Lothian in July 1639.

References

Peers of Scotland created by Charles I
1585 births
1661 deaths